Balseiro is surname and it may refer to:

José Antonio Balseiro (1919-1962), Argentinian physicist
6109 Balseiro, a main-belt asteroid
Balseiro Institute, an academic institution
Puchi Balseiro (1926-2007), a Puerto Rican composer